Motown Rage is an American nu metal band from Detroit, Michigan. They have released two albums. They were signed to Psychopathic Records sublabel Hatchet House from 2007 until 2009. They are now signed to an independent label named Luxor Records.

History

Formation 
Razor Ray and 2Def began in the band Harms Way. The group toured nationwide with several bands including Kid Rock, Insane Clown Posse, and Pantera. After going through several member changes, Ray and 2Def were the only remaining members of the group. In 2000, they were asked to back up Insane Clown Posse on their Bizaar/Bizzar tour. Ray and 2Def accepted and played guitar and bass with the duo throughout their tour. After the tour, Ray and 2Def decided to create another band that would perform a genre they called "Rap and Roll" or "Gangster Metal"."

After touring with the group Mob Mentality, Ray and 2Def approached MC Sadistic to provide lead vocals for their new band. They chose Sadistic because he had an understanding of the hip hop scene from touring with multiple hip hop groups such as Insane Clown Posse, Mystikal, Onyx, Das Efx, Eminem, and House of Krazees. After agreeing to join the group, the trio recruited Burn-1 as the fourth member and called their band Motown Rage after their home town of Detroit. On June 3, 2005, they released their self-titled debut album under Jab Records.

Hatchet House 
At the 2007 Gathering of the Juggalos, Motown Rage was announced to have signed with Hatchet House. In the following months, the group toured with Insane Clown Posse, Boondox, and Necro on the Hallowicked Tour. On April 3, 2009, Motown Rage released their second album, With Us or Against Us. Later that year, on October 16, the group announced that Frank "Foot" Hannah had joined the group as their new drummer.

In 2009 it was announced that Motown Rage was no longer on Hatchet House according to their blog on Myspace. As of the fall in 2010 Motown Rage signed to Luzor Records. Upon signing they decided that they would "Re-Release" their 2009 album With Us or Against Us and give it a new finish and add a few new tracks to it.

Band members 
Sadistic "James Johnson" – Lead vocals
Ray "Razor Ray" Reyes – Guitar, Backing vocals
Steve "2 Def" Berger – Bass
Frank "Foot" Hannah – Drums

Discography 
Motown Rage (2005)
With Us or Against Us (2009)

References

External links 
Motown Rage on Myspace

American nu metal musical groups
Rap metal musical groups
Heavy metal musical groups from Michigan
Musical groups from Detroit
2002 establishments in Michigan